Dipus is a genus of jerboa. Today only a single species is extant, the northern three-toed jerboa (Dipus sagitta), widespread throughout Central Asia. The genus has a fossil record that dates back to the Miocene, with several extinct species known from Asia. The oldest dated species is Dipus conditor.

References

Rodent genera
Mammal genera with one living species
Dipodidae